James Hallock may refer to:
 James N. Hallock (born 1941), American physicist
 James L. Hallock (1823–1894), American carpenter, farmer, and politician